A Girl Called Eddy is the self-titled debut album from singer-songwriter A Girl Called Eddy.

Track listing
All tracks written by Erin Moran except where noted.

"Tears All over Town" – 4:01
"Kathleen" – 4:47
"Girls Can Really Tear You up Inside" – 4:48
"The Long Goodbye" (E. Moran, C. Shaw) – 3:58
"Somebody Hurt You" – 5:07
"People Used to Dream About the Future" – 5:33
"Heartache" – 4:34
"Life Thru the Same Lens" – 4:18
"Did You See the Moon Tonight?" – 3:44
"Little Bird" – 3:54
"Golden" – 5:53

Reception 

The album's release met with multiple favorable reviews and "earned her the No. 1 spot on Amazon.com's 2004 list of customer favorites". Named to Uncut magazine's 2004 Albums of the Year, The Village Voice's Pazz & Jop critic's list of 2004 albums, and The Wall Street Journal'''s Top 10 of 2004.

 Song use 

The track "Somebody Hurt You" was used in series 3, episode 1 of the BBC animation show Monkey Dust to link two different sketches in the show. The juxtaposition of the light sounds of a song against the dark dystopian comedy of the program is a feature of Monkey Dust. The song "Heartache" was used in the Polish brothers' film For Lovers Only''.

References

2004 debut albums
A Girl Called Eddy albums
Anti- (record label) albums
Albums produced by Richard Hawley